Mere Dead Men (often called MDM) is an English punk band.  Formed in 1986 from the break-up of a number of other punk bands, MDM have released several albums, toured the UK, and played in various venues across Europe (such as in the Czech Republic and France).

Current members
Mandy Shaw - vocals
Rag - drums (now performing as marc..in electro punk goth duo, The Webb https://www.facebook.com/TheWebb.band?ref=hl )
Richie - bass
Rob - guitar

Partial discography

Albums
Split album with Paradox U.k. Retch records
Stacks, Stilettos, Make Up and Mohicans
Carry on MDM
United We Stand
Let's Do It

EP
Laced Up Mary

External links
2004 interview

English punk rock groups